Leon Vincent Rapkin (10 March 1929 – 23 September 1991), of England, was a philatelist who was active in various British philatelic organizations.

Collecting interests 
Rapkin was well known for his collection of classic German postage stamps and postal history, including German colonies and German post offices in other countries.

Philatelic activity 
Leon Rapkin served on the boards of various international philatelic exhibitions held in England between 1980 and 1990. He served the Royal Philatelic Society London as council member and vice president, the Germany and Colonies Philatelic Society as chairman and president, and, the British Philatelic Federation, also as chairman and president. He also served as the Keeper of the Roll of Distinguished Philatelists.

Honors and awards 
Leon Vincent Rapkin was named to the Keeper of the Roll of Distinguished Philatelists in 1984, and, in 1992, he was named to the American Philatelic Society Hall of Fame.

See also 
 Franceska Rapkin
 Postage stamps and postal history of Germany

External links 
 APS Hall of Fame – Leon Vincent Rapkin

1929 births
1991 deaths
Philatelic literature
British philatelists
Signatories to the Roll of Distinguished Philatelists
American Philatelic Society
20th-century English people
Place of birth missing
Place of death missing